In firearms terminology, the firearm frame or receiver is the part of a firearm which integrates other components by providing housing for internal action components such as the hammer, bolt or breechblock, firing pin and extractor, and has threaded interfaces for externally attaching ("receiving") components such as the barrel, stock, trigger mechanism and iron/optical sights.  The receiver is often made of forged, machined, or stamped steel or aluminium; in addition to these traditional materials, modern  science and engineering have introduced polymers and sintered metal powders to receiver construction.

Mounting 
A barrel can be fixed to the receiver using barrel and receiver action threads or similar methods.

In US law 

For the purposes of United States law, the receiver or frame is legally the firearm, and as such it is the controlled part. The definition of which assembly is the legal receiver varies from firearm to firearm, under US law. Generally, the law requires licensed manufacturers and importers to mark the designated receiver with a serial number, the manufacturer or importer, the model and caliber.  In addition, makers of receivers are restricted by International Traffic in Arms Regulations.  Thus, in the case of a firearm that has multiple receiver parts (such as the AR-15, which has an upper and a lower receiver), the legally controlled part is the one that is serialized.  For the AR-15 rifle, the lower receiver assembly is legally considered the actual receiver (although it is functionally a chassis that also houses the separate trigger group); while in the FN-FAL rifle, it is the upper assembly that is serialized and legally considered the receiver. This has led to prosecutors dropping charges against illegal manufacturing of AR-type firearms to avoid court precedents establishing that neither the upper nor the lower receiver individually contain all the components to be legally classified as a firearm.

Unfinished receivers
"Unfinished receivers", also called "80 percent receivers" or "blanks", are partially completed receivers with no serial numbers. Purchasers must perform their own finishing work in order to make the receiver usable. The finishing of receivers for sale or distribution by unlicensed persons is against US law. Because an unfinished 80% receiver is not a firearm, purchasers do not need to pass a background check. The resulting firearm is sometimes called a "ghost gun".

3D printed receivers
, two designs for 3D printable polymer lower receivers for the AR-15 have been released: the AR Lower V5 and the Charon. Like unfinished receivers, 3D-printed ones can be used to produce ghost guns. (Again under US law, the printed receiver itself is a firearm.)

References 

Firearm components